Fantasy Monsters is a set of miniatures published by Grenadier subsidiary Pinnacle Products.

Contents
Fantasy Monsters is a boxed set containing eleven scale model metal figures, with water-based paint in eight colors, two plastic trays, a brush, and painting instructions.

Reception
Steve Jackson reviewed Fantasy Monsters in The Space Gamer No. 62. Jackson commented that "Recommended, especially as a gift for a friend whom you'd like to start in the miniatures hobby."

References

See also
List of lines of miniatures

Miniature figures